Arthur Passage is a marine waterway in British Columbia, Canada. It is part of the Inside Passage connecting Grenville Channel (at its southeast end) with Malacca Passage (at its northwest end). A significant feature is Hanmer Island, located in the middle of the north end of the passage.

Name origin
Arthur Passage was named in 1867 by Captain Daniel Pender, RN, after the third governor of Vancouver Island, Arthur E. Kennedy.

Ecology
The  hyper-maritime forests  surrounding Arthur Passage have extensive areas of wet, slow-growing forests of western redcedar and  yellow-cedar. Macrofauna in the forest floor of Hanmer Island include Sowbugs, Millipedes, Centipedes, Potworms and Earthworms.

Hydrology
The Arthur Passage flood tide sets northerly and the ebb sets southerly, tidal currents attain  near Hanmer Island.

History

In the morning of January 14, 1942, the American Troopship USAT David W. Branch, carrying 350 passengers, went aground on Hammer Island.

See also
Inside Passage
Chatham Sound
Skeena river

References

External links

North Coast of British Columbia
Straits of British Columbia